We Know About the Need is the first studio album by English post-rock band Bracken. It was released on Anticon in 2007.

Reception
At Metacritic, which assigns a weighted average score out of 100 to reviews from mainstream critics, We Know About the Need received an average score of 72% based on 9 reviews, indicating "generally favorable reviews".

Marisa Brown of AllMusic said, "Bracken makes thoughtful, reflective music, like Brian Eno, or even fellow anticon labelmates Alias or cLOUDDEAD, music that refuses to sit entirely still, that attempts to convey the broad range of human emotion in the details of its composition, and, in the end, succeeds."

In December 2007, American webzine Somewhere Cold ranked We Know About the Need No. 7 on their 2007 Somewhere Cold Awards Hall of Fame.

Track listing

References

External links
 

Anticon albums
2007 debut albums
Bracken (band) albums